Saint-Vigor-d'Ymonville is a commune in the Seine-Maritime department in the Normandy region in northern France.

Geography
The commune has two distinct parts: the north contains the village, farms and woodland, the south, separated by the A131 autoroute and the canal de Tancarville, has some port activity, quarrying and reclaimed marshland

Population

Places of interest
 The twelfth-century church of St. Vigor.
 The ruins of the mediaeval priory.

See also
Communes of the Seine-Maritime department

References

Communes of Seine-Maritime